Ferlosio is a surname. Notable people with the surname include:

Chicho Sánchez Ferlosio (1940–2003), Spanish singer-songwriter
Rafael Sánchez Ferlosio (1927–2019), Spanish writer